Castellammare di Stabia is a comune in the Metropolitan City of Naples, Campania region, in southern Italy.

History

Castellammare di Stabia lies next to the ancient Roman city of Stabiae, which was destroyed by the eruption of Mount Vesuvius in AD 79. The castle, of the city it takes its name from, was erected around the 9th century on a hill commanding the southern side of the Gulf of Naples. It was restored during the reign of Frederick II of Hohenstaufen and enlarged by King Charles I of Anjou.

The comune, previously called Castellamare, assumed the name Castellammare on 22 January 1863, and the current name on 31 May 1912.

Religious buildings
 Castellammare Cathedral
 San Bartolomeo
 Santa Caterina
 Chiesa del Gesù
 Chiesa del Purgatorio

Excavation of villas
The excavation of Roman villas preserved by the eruption of Vesuvius in AD 79 is currently underway. Villa Arianna and Villa San Marco can be visited and do not charge for admission.

The thermal baths

Castellammare is known as the Metropole of the waters for its hydrological heritage of 28 different kinds of waters, divided in sulphurous, calcic bicarbonate and mineral water, each one with a particular healthy property. The thermal bath has been a huge part of the economic life as well as of the tourism of Castellammare since the 19th century. To take advantage of the waters’ property there are two different thermal baths, one in the historical centre of the town and the other on the hill. Besides, the two most important waters of Castellammare, Acqua della Madonna and Acetosella, have been known since the time of Pliny the Elder, who suggested to drink them in case of calculosis, today they are sold as far away as America.

The ancient thermal baths

The Ancient Thermal Baths were inaugurated in 1836 and since the beginning had a very important role for the citizens and also for the tourists coming in summer for the thermal cure, making the city very crowded. Because of this overcrowding the building was enlarged with new pavilions and pools for the thermal cures of the body, like a real spa but it was also a cultural centre where many art exhibitions, cultural events and concerts were held. On 26 February 1956 began the destruction of the ancient building to make way for today's building. At the end of the 1980s the thermal building was in crisis because most of its offered treatments were closed, even if today they are offered in the New Thermal Baths. Today the Ancient Baths opens only few hours a day for bathing. In summer there are some cultural events. In the summer of 2007 the renovation of the building began so it can resume the many thermal services.

The new thermal baths

The New Thermal Baths, located on the hill of the Solaro, near the district of Scanzano, was inaugurated on 26 July 1964. This building has two zones: one zone is the building dedicated to the thermal cure and then there is the park for the hydroponic cure. The building for the thermal cure offers the chance of practicing physiotherapy, hyperbaric medicine, massages, mud baths, inhalation of the sulphurous waters, rehabilitating, dermatological, aesthetic and gynaecological cures. Instead the hydroponic park allows practicing hydrotherapy, that is drinking the specific kind of water to cure specific pathologies, while walking through the park. Moreover, in summer in the park there are many events, during mornings and evenings, such as concerts, open cinema, exhibitions and conventions.

Geography
Castellammare borders with the municipalities of Gragnano, Pimonte, Pompei, Santa Maria la Carità, Torre Annunziata and Vico Equense.

It counts the hamlets (frazioni) of Fratte, Madonna della Libera, Pioppaino, Ponte Persica, Pozzano, Privati, Quisisana, Scanzano and Varano.

Sport
The local football team, SS Juve Stabia, currently plays in Italian Serie C and is one of the oldest football teams in Italy, having been created in 1907.  SS Juve Stabia plays its matches in Romeo Menti Stadium.

People
Pliny the Elder, born Gaius Plinius Secundus (AD 23 – 25 August, AD 79), adoptive citizen and resident of Stabiae (ancient name of Castellammare di Stabia), where he died during the 25 August, AD 79 Mt. Vesuvius eruption. Roman author, naturalist, and natural philosopher, as well as naval and army commander of the early Roman Empire, and personal friend of the emperor Vespasian.
Catello, Saint (9th century), Patron of the city
Giuseppe Bonito (1707–1789), painter
Nikolai Gogol (1809–1852) worked here on his Dead Souls in 1838, while living at the count Repnin's summer house.
Luigi Denza (1846–1922), composer of the most famous Italian traditional song Funiculì, Funiculà
Michele Esposito (1855–1929), influential composer, pianist, and conductor, who worked mostly in Ireland
Ettore Tito (1859–1941), painter
Raffaele Viviani (1888–1950), author, playwright, actor, musician
John Serry, Sr. (1915–2003; aka Giovanni Serrapica) American musician, composer, arranger, educator
Gabriele De Rosa (1917–2009), historian and politician
Marcel Jovine (1921–2003), sculptor and toy designer
Pupetta Maresca (1935-2021), 86, Italian mobster convicted murderer, and beauty queen
Mario Merola (1934–2006), Neapolitan-style singer
Giuseppe (born 1959) and Carmine Abbagnale (born 1962), Olympic gold medal rowers, grown up and trained at the Castellammare Yachting Club
Aldo Arcangioli (born 1969), entrepreneur
Gennaro Iezzo (born 1973), football goalkeeper
Raffaele Imperiale (born 1974), Italian mobster, high-ranking member of Camorra
Bruno Cirillo (born 1977), footballer
Antonio Mirante (born 1983), goalkeeper for AC Milan
Fabio Quagliarella (born 1983), striker and captain for Sampdoria
Luigi Vitale (born 1987), footballer
Antonio Donnarumma (born 1990) Padova goalkeeper, older brother of Gianluigi Donnarumma
Gianluigi Donnarumma (born 1999), goalkeeper for Paris Saint-Germain and the Italy national team, second-youngest goalkeeper to play in Serie A
Sebastiano Esposito (born 2002), forward for FC Basel

See also
Stabiae
Juve Stabia
Province of Naples
Regio Cantiere di Castellammare di Stabia
Reggia di Quisisana

References

External links

Castellammare di Stabia official website 

 
Cities and towns in Campania
Coastal towns in Campania
Municipalities of the Metropolitan City of Naples
Spa towns in Italy